For information on all Lamar University sports, see Lamar Cardinals and Lady Cardinals
The following is a list of Lamar Cardinals football head coaches and records while at Lamar.  This list only includes coaches during the four year college period.

Coaches

Updated through November 19, 2022

References

Lamar
Lamar Cardinals football coaches